Łukasz Zalewski (born 25 May 1977) is a Polish former competitive ice dancer. Skating with Julie Keeble for the United Kingdom, he became the 1999 Karl Schäfer Memorial champion, 1999 Skate Israel bronze medalist, and 2000 British national champion. During his career with Keeble and with Jolanta Bury for Poland, Zalewski competed in the final segment at four ISU Championships.

Personal life 
Zalewski was born on 25 May 1977 in Gdańsk, Poland. He began living in England in 1991 and studied computer science at Queen Mary University of London, at undergraduate and postgraduate level.

Career

Early career 
Zalewski began learning to skate in 1984. Early in his career, he represented Poland with Jolanta Bury. The two placed 19th at the 1995 World Junior Championships, held in November 1994 in Budapest, Hungary, and won the silver medal at the European Youth Olympic Days in February 1995 in Andorra la Vella.

Continuing in the junior ranks, Bury/Zalewski took silver at the 1995 Blue Swords and then placed 7th at the 1996 World Junior Championships, held in late 1995 in Brisbane, Australia. They began appearing on the senior level in the 1996–1997 season. They would win two national bronze medals before parting ways.

Partnership with Keeble 
In 1998, Zalewski was partnered with British ice dancer Julie Keeble by their coach, Garry Alan Hoppe, in London, England. The duo competed on the senior level, representing the United Kingdom internationally. In the 1998–1999 season, they placed fourth at the British Championships, a few weeks after beginning their partnership.

The following season, Keeble/Zalewski won gold at the 1999 Karl Schäfer Memorial in October, gold at the British Championships in November, and bronze at the 1999 Skate Israel in December. In February, the duo finished 16th at the 2000 European Championships, held in Vienna, Austria. In March, they qualified to the free dance at the 2000 World Championships in Nice, France; they ranked 23rd in the original dance, 21st in the free dance, and 21st overall.

Keeble and Zalewski decided to retire from competition in August 2000.

Programs 
(with Keeble)

Competitive highlights

With Keeble for the United Kingdom

With Bury for Poland

References 

1977 births
British male ice dancers
Polish male ice dancers
Living people
Sportspeople from Gdańsk